China Resources Enterprise is the subsidiary and the listed company of China Resources Holdings. It is a conglomerate enterprise focusing on retailing, beverage, food processing and distribution, textiles and real estate in Hong Kong and Mainland China. Its assets include a 51% share in CR Snow, the largest brewing company in China and a joint venture with SAB Miller.

It was a Hang Seng Index Constituent Stock (blue chip) and is Hang Seng China-Affiliated Corporations Index Constitute Stock (red chip) in the Hong Kong stock market.

See also 
China Resources
Beer and breweries in China

References

External links

Companies listed on the Hong Kong Stock Exchange
Conglomerate companies of China
Government-owned companies of China
China Resources
Conglomerate companies of Hong Kong
Former companies in the Hang Seng Index
Red chip companies